Rüdiger Helm (born in Neubrandenburg on 6 October 1956) was an East German sprint canoeist who competed from the mid-1970s to the mid-1980s. Competing in two Summer Olympics, he won six medals which included three golds (1976: K-1 1000 m, 1980: K-1 1000 m, K-4 1000 m) and three bronzes (1976: K-1 500 m, K-4 1000 m; 1980: K-2 500 m).

Helm also won 19 medals at the ICF Canoe Sprint World Championships with ten golds (K-1 1000 m: 1978, 1979, 1981, 1982, 1983; K-2 500 m: 1978, K-4 500 m: 1983, K-4 1000 m: 1978, 1979, 1981), six silvers (K-1 1000 m: 1977, K-2 500 m: 1979, K-4 500 m: 1982, K-4 1000 m: 1975, 1982, 1983), and three bronzes (K-1 1000 m: 1975, K-2 1000 m: 1974, K-4 500 m: 1981).

References

External links
 
 

1956 births
Living people
People from Neubrandenburg
People from Bezirk Neubrandenburg
German male canoeists
Sportspeople from Mecklenburg-Western Pomerania
Olympic canoeists of East Germany
Canoeists at the 1976 Summer Olympics
Canoeists at the 1980 Summer Olympics
Olympic gold medalists for East Germany
Olympic bronze medalists for East Germany
Olympic medalists in canoeing
ICF Canoe Sprint World Championships medalists in kayak
Medalists at the 1980 Summer Olympics
Medalists at the 1976 Summer Olympics
Recipients of the Patriotic Order of Merit (honor clasp)